Carl Henry Keller (January 9, 1875 – March 29, 1952) was the mayor of Toledo, Ohio, from 1914 to 1915.

Biography
He was born on January 9, 1875, in Ohio to John Jacob Keller and Christiana Mathias. Keller married Mame Sophia Duetscher. He was elected mayor of Toledo, Ohio, in 1914 and served till 1915. In 1914 Governor James M. Cox received a request for Keller to be removed from office as he has accused of permitting gambling. He died on March 29, 1952, in Osceola County, Florida.

Gallery

References

1875 births
1952 deaths
Mayors of Toledo, Ohio